Milica Deura (born July 22, 1990 in Knin, SFR Yugoslavia) is a Bosnian professional basketball player. She played as a point guard who most recently played for the Rutronik Stars Keltern in Eurocup Women.

Honours
Partizan 
 National Championship of Serbia (1): 2012-13
 National Cup of Serbia (1): 2012-13
 Adriatic League Women (1): 2012-13

References

External links
Profile at eurobasket.com

1990 births
Living people
Sportspeople from Knin
Bosnia and Herzegovina women's basketball players
Bosnia and Herzegovina expatriate basketball people in Germany
Bosnia and Herzegovina expatriate basketball people in Romania
Shooting guards
ŽKK Partizan players
ŽKK Crvena zvezda players
Croatian expatriate basketball people in Serbia